List of Washington railroads may refer to:

 List of Washington (state) railroads
 List of Washington, D.C., railroads